

Ealdbeorht (or Alberthus or Ealdberht) may have been a medieval Bishop of Dunwich.

According to Powicke and Fryde (2nd ed., 1961) Ealdbeorht was in office as bishop of Dunwich in 775, having succeeded Eardwulf some time after 747, and in turn being succeeded by Heardred some time before 781.

However, he is not included in the list of bishops in the third edition of the book (1986), where no entry intervenes between Eardwulf and Heardred.  Nor was he included in the Prosopography of Anglo-Saxon England.

It would seem that whatever source was previously thought to imply his existence is now no longer thought to do so.

Citations

References
Powicke, F. Maurice and E. B. Fryde Handbook of British Chronology 2nd. ed. London:Royal Historical Society 1961

Bishops of Dunwich (ancient)